Pristimantis cabrerai is a species of frog in the family Strabomantidae. It is endemic to Colombia and is known from the Cordillera Occidental in Antioquia and Caldas Departments. Although common name Valle robber frog has been suggested for it, the specimen from Valle del Cauca is no longer assigned to this species.

Etymology
The specific name cabrerai honours Mr. Isodore Cabrera, a Colombian naturalist and collector.

Description
The species was described based on a series of seven specimens from Antioquia. The canthus rostralis is rounded but distinct. The eye is relatively large and prominent. The ear is complete but concealed, with only a depression where tympanum would normally be located. Fingers and toes are fairly long; the toes have traces of webbing. Skin of the upper parts is pustular.

Habitat and conservation
It occurs among fallen leaves and in branches and leaves of low herbaceous vegetation. It is an uncommon species threatened by habitat loss.

References

cabrerai
Amphibians of the Andes
Amphibians of Colombia
Endemic fauna of Colombia
Amphibians described in 1970
Taxa named by Doris Mable Cochran
Taxonomy articles created by Polbot